Members of the Legislative Council of Northern Rhodesia from 1959 until 1962 were elected on 20 March 1959. The first session of the newly elected council started on 7 April. There were 22 elected members,  four appointed members, four ex officio members and the Speaker.

List of members

Elected members

Replacements

Nominated members

Replacements

Ex officio members

References

1959